The Sony α NEX-5 is a digital camera launched on 11 May 2010. It is a mirrorless interchangeable lens camera with the body size of a larger model fairly compact point-and-shoot camera with a larger sensor size (APS-C) comparable to that of some digital single-lens reflex cameras. Its major competitors in the market are the cameras based on the micro 4/3 standard created by Panasonic and Olympus, and a few low end Canon, Nikon, and even Sony α DSLRs. The NEX-5 shoots 14.2 megapixel stills and has a 7 frame/s continuous shotmode. It has the capability to shoot 1920×1080i at 60 frame/s in AVCHD or 1440×1080p at 30 frame/s in MPEG4. The NEX-5 was replaced by the 16 megapixel NEX-5N in August 2011.

Features
The α NEX-5 has features found in SLR cameras but also some that are normally found in point and shoots. The body of the α NEX-5 is made of magnesium alloy that separates the NEX-5 from the less expensive polymer NEX-3. Also different from the NEX-3 is video quality. The NEX-5 can shoot in AVCHD 1080/60i HD. There is a 7 frame/s continuous shot mode, with autofocus disabled after the first frame. The APS-C sized sensor  has an ISO sensitivity up to 12,800. The camera software has special features like twilight mode and sweep panorama. The latter lets the photographer sweep across a city-sky line or similar long view and have the photos automatically stitched into a JPEG image on camera.

Lenses

The NEX-5 along with its sister, the NEX-3, and also the Sony Handycam NEX-VG10 use a new lens mount system developed by Sony for NEX series and known as the Sony E-mount. Initially, there were three available lenses: an all-purpose 18–55 mm lens, an ultra wide pancake 16 mm lens, and a wide range 18–200 mm E-mount lens.

With the post-November 2010 firmware version 3 installed, and by using the (roughly US$200) Sony LA-EA1 adapter, the NEX series of cameras is able to electronically control the aperture and autofocus of Sony SSM/SAM A-mount lenses, and control the aperture of the other Sony/Minolta A-mount lenses with manual focus only. The (roughly US$400) Sony LA-EA2 adapter also supports autofocus with screw-drive A-mount lenses, firmware version 5 is required for this adapter.

Other third-party mechanical tube adapters are also available. These adapters enable the use of Canon FD-mount, Canon EF-mount (without aperture control), Contax G, M42 screw mount, Konica Hexanon AR-mount, Minolta SR-mount (MC/MD), Leica M and screw mount, Nikon F-mount (non-G), Pentax K-mount (non-DA), Olympus OM mount, T2 screw mount and Minolta/Konica Minolta/Sony A-mount lenses. The E-mount flange register is so short that it is possible to mount 45 mm or longer-focal-length non-focusing enlarging lenses on the NEX body, with the use of an intermediate focusing helicoid behind them.

Certain third-party mechanical adapters also provide circular control rings that provide some mechanical control of the aperture of Nikon G, Pentax DA and Canon EF lenses, as these do not have a mechanical aperture control ring on their lens barrels.

Model definitions

The incomplete model number of NEX-3/NEX-5 series may include letter(s) at end. The definitions are:

 C: Not compatible with Eye-Fi function (NEX-3C and NEX-5C only)
 A: Supplied with E 2.8/16mm (SEL-16F28)
 D: Supplied with E 2.8/16mm (SEL-16F28) and E 3,5-5,6/18-55mm OSS (SEL-1855)
 H: Supplied with E 3.5-6.3/18-200mm OSS (SEL-18200)
 K: Supplied with E 3.5-5.6/18-55mm OSS (SEL-1855)
 L: Supplied with E 3.5-5.6/16-50mm OSS (SEL-1650)
 B: Body color is black
 N: Body color is black
 /N: Body color is gold (NEX-5D/N, Japan only)
 /P: Body color is pink (NEX-3D/P, Asia only)
 R: Body color is red
 S: Body color is silver
 /T: Body color is brown (NEX-3D/T, Asia only)
 50i: 50 frames interlaced model
 60i: 60 frames interlaced model

For example, NEX-5CK/B 50i is a NEX-5 supplied with E 18–55 mm zoom lens, not compatible with Eye-Fi function, body color black, and with 50i (not 60i) video support.

See also
Sony NEX-7

References

External links 

 SonyStyle product description – official Sony website
 Sony UK product presentation – official Sony UK website
 DP Review (Digital Photography Review) – June 2010, an in-depth review of the two cameras
 Pop Photo Review – May 2010 review

NEX-5
NEX-5